The discography of Damien Done, an American post-punk / gothic rock band, includes one studio album, four extended plays, five internet compilation extended plays, twelve singles and six music videos.

The band recorded its debut EP, Love Thongs, in September 2003, which was scheduled for release through Belgian record label Good Life Recordings in early 2004; the EP was ultimately shelved for thirteen years. Meanwhile, the band self-released a series of internet compilations through Bandcamp, including Electron(ish), Outtakes & Rarities, Blown Covers, and an expanded edition of Love Thongs and Bits of Happy under the title Stay Black. Love Thongs was finally picked up by German record label Demons Run Amok Entertainment, which released it under the new title Stay Black in July 2016. The double A-side single "He Really Tried" / "And Now the Rain" was simultaneously released through Demons Run Amok.

Damien Done followed-up with Charm Offensive, the band's debut full-length album, released in March 2018 by American record label Mind Over Matter Records and Belgian record label Hypertension Records. The album spanned the singles "Curious Thing", "Primitive", "The Lord Fox", and "Roof Access". In February 2020, Damien Done released the EP Baby, Don't Hearse Me through Mind Over Matter Records. The band quickly followed up with the To Night EP and its accompanied title song single, co-released in May 2020 by Mind Over Matter Records, with American record label Contraband Goods and British record label Speedowax Records. In July 2020, the band released a cover single of House of Love's "Shine On", and in February 2021, another cover single of Iggy Pop and David Bowie's "Nightclubbing" was released. 

The band's sophomore full-length album, Total Power, is scheduled for release through Mind Over Matter Records in May 2023. The debut single from the release, "Pray for Me", was released on January 31, 2023.

Albums

Studio albums

Extended plays

Studio extended plays

Compilation extended plays

Singles

Singles

Videos

Music videos

Other appearances

References

External links 

 
 
 
 

Discography
Discographies of American artists
Rock music group discographies